Damien Jerome Francis (born 27 February 1979 in Wandsworth, England) is a retired Jamaican international footballer who played as a defensive midfielder.

Club career

Early career
As a child Francis followed Wimbledon, and was a ball boy at their ground. He started playing for the club aged 9, originally as a defender, before moving into midfield.

After several successful seasons with Wimbledon Francis moved to Norwich City and made a good impression including helping them reach the Premiership by winning the Championship in season 2003-2004.

Wigan
After Norwich were relegated at the end of their first season in the Premiership after a disappointing campaign, Francis made the decision to end his two-year stay at Carrow Road but remained in the Premiership by securing a transfer to promoted Wigan Athletic.

Despite Wigan's success in finishing 10th in the Premiership and reaching the League Cup final, it was a disappointing spell professionally for Francis, who did not feature as much as he would have liked to. He signed for newly promoted Watford for a fee of £1.5 million at the start of the 2006-2007 season.

Watford
On debut against Everton, he claimed a goal, only for it to be ruled an own goal by Alan Stubbs by the Premier League's Goals Panel. Francis would go on to feature regularly for Watford that season, playing 39 times and scoring four goals. These included a goal in Watford's run to the FA Cup semi-finals, against Ipswich Town in the fifth round. On 21 April 2007, in a game against Manchester City Francis injured his cruciate knee ligaments, an injury that was expected to keep him out for around six months. As a consequence of the 1–1 draw in that game, Watford were relegated.
Francis injury actually kept him out for 18 months. He failed to recover fully from the injury and was forced to retire from football on 3 October 2008.

Career statistics

Club
Source:

References

External links
Damien Francis profile at watfordfc.co.uk

Career information at ex-canaries.co.uk

1979 births
Living people
Premier League players
English Football League players
English footballers
Jamaican footballers
Norwich City F.C. players
Watford F.C. players
Wigan Athletic F.C. players
Wimbledon F.C. players
Footballers from Wandsworth
English people of Jamaican descent
Jamaica international footballers
Association football midfielders